The Seven Hills School is a PreK–12 private school in Cincinnati, Ohio, United States. It was established in 1974 with roots dating back to 1906 and operates on two campuses; Hillsdale (PreK–12) and Doherty (PreK–5). It is accredited by the Independent Schools Association of the Central States (ISACS) and is a member of the National Association of Independent Schools (NAIS).

History
The College Preparatory School for Girls (CPS) was founded by Mary Harlan Doherty in 1906.

In 1916, Helen Lotspeich founded the Clifton Open-Air School. The school was moved from the Clifton neighborhood to its present location on Red Bank Road in 1930.

In 1927, another all-girls school called the Hillsdale School opened. A groundbreaking ceremony was held at the school's Deerfield Road location on June 6, 1927, ahead of the official opening on September 28, 1927. An announcement letter from the school's formulating committee stated, "A new Country Junior and Senior High School for girls has been organized in Cincinnati along modern educational lines."

The Hillsdale School later merged to form the Hillsdale-Lotspeich School. In the summer of 1955, Hillsdale-Lotspeich obtained 20 acres of land on Red Bank Road, neighboring the existing Hillsdale School. The Hillsdale-Lotspeich School became partially co-educational in 1971.

In 1974, the high schools of the College Preparatory School and the Hillsdale-Lotspeich School merged to form the Seven Hills School, operating out of the Hillsdale campus on Red Bank Road. The new school's opening was marked with a convocation on September 19, 1974. Following the merger, the College Preparatory School's location in Madisonville continued to operate as an elementary school, while the Hillsdale campus operated all grades from preschool to twelfth grade.

The school undertook two major construction projects in 2001. The 75-year-old upper school building on the Hillsdale campus was demolished to make way for a new building that would be more than twice as big. Upper school classes were held in temporary buildings for a year before the new building opened. Additionally, a 1920s building on the Doherty campus was demolished and replaced with Haile Hall, a new facility housing the preschool, kindergarten, and afterschool programs as well as Doherty's administration offices.

Athletics
The Seven Hills Stingers are a member of the Miami Valley Conference, which is part of the Ohio High School Athletic Association. Seven Hills has a combined total of ninety-seven teams playing soccer, basketball, baseball, softball, track and field, volleyball, tennis, cross country running, golf, gymnastics, cheerleading, lacrosse, swimming, and diving.

Notable alumni
 Mohini Bhardwaj, Olympic gymnast
 Dana Fabe, Chief Justice of the Alaska Supreme Court
 E. R. Fightmaster, actor, producer, and writer
 Tiffany Hines, actress
 Andy Paris, actor and playwright
 Curtis Sittenfeld, writer
 P.G. Sittenfeld, City Council of Cincinnati member, convicted in 2022 for federal charges of bribery and attempted extortion
 Wes Gardner, former Major League Baseball player

References

External links

 

Private schools in Cincinnati
High schools in Hamilton County, Ohio
Middle schools in Hamilton County, Ohio
Elementary schools in Hamilton County, Ohio
Educational institutions established in 1974
1974 establishments in Ohio
Private high schools in Ohio
Private middle schools in Ohio
Private elementary schools in Ohio